Championship Off-Road, officially known as AMSOIL Championship Off-Road (as Amsoil holds the naming rights) and abbreviated to COR, is an American short course off-road racing series. Founded in 2020 and sanctioned by the International Series of Champions (ISOC), the series mainly competes in the Midwestern United States.

History
TORC: The Off-Road Championship was originally the preeminent sanctioning body for short course off-road racing in the Midwest before its folding in 2018. The Lucas Oil Off Road Racing Series then took over as the main series in the region via the Lucas Oil Midwest Short Course League until its dissolution after the 2019 season as officials elected to focus on LOORRS. In October 2019, ISOC partnered with Crandon International Off-Road Raceway, Bark River Raceway, and ERX Motor Park to create Championship Off-Road.

Championship Off-Road's inaugural season in 2020 was marred by the COVID-19 pandemic, and resulting restrictions on attendance forced Bark River to cancel its races. The opener was held at ERX on July 10–11.

LOORRS released its 2021 schedule in October 2020 at only three tracks. On November 13, Lucas Oil Products announced that it has ended sponsoring and operating the LOORRS series. This closure left COR (and the dissimilar Stadium Super Trucks) as the only short course off-road racing sanctioning bodies remaining. Many of the West Coast teams raced in the Midwest for the season.

Media
COR races are streamed online at Vimeo Livestream. The booth consists of Brent Smith and Cheyne Statezny while Haley Shanley serves as track reporter. CBS Sports Network assumed television rights beginning in 2022.

Tracks

Champions
Source:

1600 Light Buggy
 2020: Billy Buth
 2021: Colin Schulz

1600 Single Buggy
 2020: Billy Buth
 2021: Dylan Parsons

Pro Buggy
 2020: Michael Hester

Super Buggy
 2021: Michael Meister

Super Stock Truck
 2020: Nick Visser
 2021: Joe Maciosek

Classix
 2020: Dale Chestnut

Formula 4x4
 2020: Danny Beauchamp

Stock Truck
 2020: Collin Wichman
 2021: Diesel Shanak

Sportsman SxS
 2020: Dylan Marquardt
 2021: Colin Kernz

Mod Kart
 2020: Easton Sleaper
 2021: Easton Sleaper

Short Course Kart
 2020: Andy Johnson
 2021: Ava Lawrence

Pro 4
 2020: Kyle LeDuc
 2021: C. J. Greaves

Pro 2
 2020: Kyle Kleiman
 2021: Keegan Kincaid

Pro Mod SxS
 2020: C. J. Greaves
 2021: Rodney Vaneperen

Pro Lite
 2020: John Holtger
 2021: Brock Heger

Pro Stock SxS
 2020: C. J. Greaves
 2021: Rodney Vaneperen

Pro Am SxS
 2020: Dylan Marquardt

170 SxS
 2020: Ellah Holtger
 2021: Kody Krantz

450 Mod Karts
 2020: John Holtger

570 SxS
 2021: Chase Braun

Pro 2 vs. Pro 4
 2020: Zachery Kirchner

Pro Spec
 2021: Ryan Beat

References

External links
 

2020 establishments in the United States
Auto racing series in the United States
Off-road racing series
Recurring events established in 2020
Recurring sporting events established in 2020